Jack Mullaney (September 18, 1929 – June 27, 1982) was an American actor. He appeared on Broadway in "The Remarkable Mr. Pennypacker" from 1953 to 1954. Mullaney acted in several television series and films throughout his career.

Early life
He was born in Pittsburgh, Pennsylvania. The 1940 United States Census shows Jack Mullaney living on Minot Avenue in the Oakley neighborhood of Cincinnati, Ohio.

Career
Mullaney made his film debut in The Young Stranger in 1957. That same year he appeared as Ensign Lewis in the comedy Kiss Them for Me, starring Cary Grant.

He appeared regularly as Johnny Wallace, a bellhop, in CBS's The Ann Sothern Show (1958–1961). He also portrayed United States Navy Lieutenant (junior grade) Rex St. John in NBC's Ensign O'Toole (1962–1963). He played Hector Canfield on the CBS science-fiction comedy TV series It's About Time (1966-1967).

In the 1958 film South Pacific, based on the Rodgers and Hammerstein hit musical, he played a character affectionately known as the "Professor." He appeared as murderer Bert Rockwood on episode #227 of Lee Marvin's M Squad, titled "The Vanishing Lady," which first aired April 3, 1959, and also had a small, but important, role in the 1964 political thriller Seven Days in May. He worked in two Elvis Presley features late in the rock singers film career, 1965's Tickle Me and Spinout in 1966.

Death
Mullaney's death, from a stroke, occurred in Hollywood, June 27, 1982, at age 52. His sister was the heir to his estate.

He is buried near his parents in Gate of Heaven Cemetery, Montgomery, Ohio.

Television appearances

 Men of Annapolis, syndicated series, in two episodes as Styron
 The Ann Sothern Show
 Ensign O'Toole with Dean Jones
 My Living Doll with Bob Cummings and Julie Newmar
 The Many Loves of Dobie Gillis
 It's About Time
 Alfred Hitchcock Presents SO1E33 : "The belfry" 1956.
 George directed by Marshall Thompson
 The Barbara Stanwyck Show as Jed Krieger in "House in Order" (1960)
 The Law and Mr. Jones, episode "The Concert", (March 10, 1961)
 The DuPont Show with June Allyson as Jerry in "Love on Credit" (1960) and Philip Roberts in "Our Man in Rome" (1961)
 The Phil Silvers Show (1956, season one), "War Games," as new recruit/radio operator (uncredited)
 That Girl, episode 18, "Many Happy Returns," as IRS auditor Leon Cobb

Filmography

 The Young Stranger (1957) - Confused Boy
 The Vintage (1957) - Etienne
 Kiss Them for Me (1957) - Ens. Albert Lewis
 South Pacific (1958) - The Professor
 All the Fine Young Cannibals (1960) - Putney Tinker
 The Absent-Minded Professor (1961) - Air Force Captain
 The Honeymoon Machine (1961) - Lt. Beauregard 'Beau' Gilliam
 Seven Days in May (1964) - Lt. (j.g.) Dorsey Grayson (uncredited)
 Tickle Me (1965) - Stanley Potter
 Dr. Goldfoot and the Bikini Machine (1965) - Igor
 Spinout (1966) - Curly
 Little Big Man (1970) - Card Player with Full House
 Love Hate Love (1972) - Mr. Leffingwell's Male Secretary
 George! (1972) - Walter
 When the Legends Die (1972) - Gas Station Attendant
 Little Miss Marker (1980) - Casino Pit Boss (final film role)

References

External links

https://www.upi.com/Archives/1982/06/27/Veteran-television-actor-Jack-Mullaney-who-appeared-in-such/5660393998400/

1929 births
1982 deaths
Male actors from Pittsburgh
American male television actors
American male film actors
People from Greater Los Angeles
20th-century American male actors